Ground itch refers to the inflammatory reaction resulting from certain helminthic invasions into the skin.

Presentation 

Effects due to Penetration by larvae 
 Maculopapular rash
 Localized erythema
 Intense itching ( usually between the toes )

Cause
The responsible agents include:
 Threadworms
 Strongyloides stercoralis
 Hookworms
 Ancylostoma duodenale
 Necator americanus
 Ancylostoma braziliense

See also
 Cutaneous larva migrans
 Hookworm disease

References

Parasitic infestations, stings, and bites of the skin